Latimenes is a monotypic Indomalayan genus of potter wasps, the single species, Latimenes latipennis, was originally named by Frederick Smith in 1858 as Odynerus latipennis.

References

Biological pest control wasps
Monotypic Hymenoptera genera
Potter wasps